Loisati is a village in Hsi Hseng Township, Taunggyi District, in the Shan State of eastern Burma.  It is located just to the north of Tongkaw off the National Highway 5.

References

External links
Maplandia World Gazetteer

Populated places in Taunggyi District
Hsi Hseng Township